Hemidactylus pseudomuriceus is a species of gecko. It is found in West Africa (Ivory Coast) and Central Africa (Cameroon, Central African Republic, and Republic of the Congo).

It's reproduction is oviparous and it presents the following characteristics: a distinctly enlarged central row of hexagonal scales on the ventral surface of the tail, thub normal with claw, 14-17 preanal pores in males and scansors on the ventral surface of the first and fourth toe low.

References

Hemidactylus
Reptiles described in 2003
Taxa named by Klaus Henle
Taxa named by Wolfgang Böhme (herpetologist)
Reptiles of West Africa
Reptiles of Cameroon
Reptiles of the Central African Republic
Fauna of Ivory Coast
Reptiles of the Republic of the Congo